Janov is a town in Bruntál District in the Moravian-Silesian Region of the Czech Republic. It has about 300 inhabitants and it is one of the least populated towns in the country.

Geography
It is situated in the Osoblažsko microregion, on the border with Poland.

Janov is located in the valley of the river Osoblaha in the Zlatohorská Highlands.

History

Janov was probably founded in 1251 by Bishop Bruno von Schauenburg as an agricultural forest village. From its inception until 1588, Janov was part of the Osoblaha estate, owned by the bishops of Olomouc. In 1535, it was promoted to a free mining town by bishop Stanislav I Thurzo. It was assumed that there are rich deposits of precious metals around the town and its mining will bring prosperity and wealth. Although the assumptions were not met and the mining ended in 1581, the already granted privileges helped the development of Janov and gave the town an urban character.

The prosperity ended with the Thirty Years' War, when Janov was occupied by the Swedish army. In 1741 during the War of the Austrian Succession, the town was burned down by Prussians. However, the town recovered. In 1938, Janov was annexed by the Nazi Germany. After the war, the German population was expelled and the town depopulated.

Sights
The square is considered architecturally valuable. In the western corner of the square there is the late Baroque Church of the Holy Trinity built in 1780–1783, with a cemetery located on the grounds. In the middle of the square are the Mining Memorial erected for the 650th anniversary of the town and the baroque statue of the Virgin Mary Immaculate from 1739. The cemetery includes two valuable chapels from the 19th century.

A regional museum is located on the premises of the town hall.

On the right bank of the Osoblaha there is a linden tree that can be up to 1000 years old. It is one of the oldest and largest trees in the country.

Notable people
Rudolf Mildner (1902–?), Austrian-German SS officer

References

External links

Cities and towns in the Czech Republic
Populated places in Bruntál District